William Stubbs (July 11, 1847 – December 28, 1926) was a Canadian veterinarian, farmer, and politician.

Born in Caledon Township, Canada West, the son of John Stubbs and Susannah Lauden, who were from County Fermanagh, Ireland and came to Canada in 1824. Stubbs was educated in public school and at the Veterinary College of Medicine in Toronto, where he graduated in March 1868. He was the Ontario Government Veterinary Surgeon for the District of Peel and Cardwell. Stubbs was Deputy Reeve and Reeve of the Township of Caledon for several years. He was first elected to the House of Commons of Canada in an 1895 by-election for the electoral district of Cardwell. An Independent Conservative, he was re-elected in the 1896 election. He was defeated in the 1900 election.

In 1888, he married Annie Gillespie.

References

1847 births
1926 deaths
Independent Conservative MPs in the Canadian House of Commons
Canadian people of Irish descent
Members of the House of Commons of Canada from Ontario
People from Caledon, Ontario